Potomac Mills is a census-designated place in Prince William County, Virginia. The population as of the 2010 Census was 5,614. It consists of the Potomac Mills mall and surrounding residential and commercial area, adjoining Dale City and Lake Ridge.

References

Census-designated places in Prince William County, Virginia
Washington metropolitan area
Census-designated places in Virginia